Amphonyx mephisto is a moth of the  family Sphingidae. It is found from southern Brazil to Paraguay and Argentina.

References

Amphonyx
Moths described in 2002
Moths of South America